The Municipal Hall of Puebla is a building in Puebla's historic centre, in the Mexican state of Puebla.

External links
 

1906 establishments in Mexico
Buildings and structures completed in 1906
Buildings and structures in Puebla (city)
Historic centre of Puebla